David Thompson (born September 29, 1956) is an American writer, playwright, and producer. His notable theater productions include Chicago, Scottsboro Boys, The Prince of Broadway, and the upcoming production of New York, New York.

Thompson was born in La Grange, IL, and attended Lyons Township High School. Thompson is a graduate from Northwestern University's Medill School of Journalism.[1] Thompson is a resident of Millburn, New Jersey.

Early Years 
The son of two school teachers, Thompson was first introduced to theater through his family’s summer theater company, The Troupe (now known as Rocky Mountain Repertory Theatre) in Grand Lake, Colorado. Started in the early 1960s by Thompson’s father, David L. Thompson, The Troupe presented musicals and straight shows in repertory. Thompson and his five siblings were involved in all aspects of production.

After graduating from Northwestern University, Thompson lived in Chicago and worked at St. Nicholas Theatre and the Mayor’s Office of Special Events. He then moved to New York, where he started his career at Circle Repertory Theater.

Career 
BROADWAY AND WEST END:  Librettos for:   

- 2023: New York, New York, Music and Lyrics by John Kander and Fred Ebb, Additional Lyrics by Lin-Manuel Miranda,  Co-Written by Sharon Washington,  Directed and Choreographed by Susan Stroman.  St. James Theater

- 2020: Rags,  Music by Charles Strousse, Lyrics by Stephen Schwartz, London’s Park Theatre (New libretto)

- 2017: Prince of Broadway, Directed by Hal Prince, Choreographed by Susan Stroman, Samuel J. Friedman Theatre (Conceiver)

- 2014: Scottsboro Boys, Music and Lyrics by John Kander and Fred Ebb, Directed and Choreographed by Susan Stroman, winner of London’s Critic Circle Award, Evening Standard Award,  Garrick Theatre and the Young Vic Theatre

- 2011: Scottsboro Boys, 12 Tony nominations including “Best Book,” Drama Desk Nomination, Outer Critics and Lucille Lortel Awards for “Best Musical,” Hull-Warriner Award, Lyceum Theater and the Vineyard Theatre

- 2001: Thou Shalt Not, Music and Lyrics by Harry Connick, Jr., Directed and Choreographed by Susan Stroman, Lincoln Center

- 1997: Steel Pier, Music and Lyrics by John Kander and Fred Ebb, Directed by Scott Ellis, Choreographed by Susan Stroman.  11 Tony Nominations including “Best Book.” Richard Rodgers Theater

- 1997: Chicago, Music and Lyrics by John Kander and Fred Ebb, Directed by Walter Bobbie, Choreographed by Anne Reinking. Tony Award, Best Musical Revival, longest running American musical  (Script Adaptation)

OFF-BROADWAY/ REGIONAL:  Librettos for:

- 2018: The Beast in the Jungle, Vineyard Theatre, Music by John Kander, directed and choreographed by Susan Stroman.  Outer Critics nomination

- 1991 – 2019: A Christmas Carol, McCarter Theater

-1991 – 1992: And the World Goes ‘Round, Westside Theater (Co-Conceiver), Winner of New York Drama Desk Award, Lucille Lortel Award, Outer Critics Circle Award

- 1990: 70, Girls, 70, Chichester Festival, (New libretto)

-1988: Flora, the Red Menace,  Vineyard Theater, Drama Desk nomination, (New libretto)

TELEVISION credits for PBS include:

- 2018: Harold Prince – the Director’s Life (Co-Producer, Writer)

- 1998: Razzle Dazzle, The Music of Kander and Ebb (Writer)

- 1992: Sondheim – A Celebration at Carnegie Hall  (Writer)

CONCERT credits at Carnegie Hall include:

- 2011:   “James Taylor’s ‘Perspective Series’” (Producer, Writer)

- 1999:   “My Favorite Broadway/The Leading Ladies” (Writer)

Awards and nominations
 1988: Drama Desk Nomination, Flora, the Red Menace
 1992: Winner of New York Drama Desk Award, And the World Goes 'Round
 1992: Winner Lucille Lortel Award, Outer Critics Circle Award, And the World Goes 'Round
 1992: Outer Critics Circle Award, And the World Goes 'Round
 1997: Tony Award nomination for Best Book of a Musical, Steel Pier (musical)
 2010: Drama Desk Award for Outstanding Book of a Musical, The Scottsboro Boys
 2011: Tony Awards nomination for Best Book of a Musical, The Scottsboro Boys
 2011: Lucille Lortel Award for Best Musical, The Scottsboro Boys
 2014: London’s Critic Circle Award, The Scottsboro Boys

References

External links
 

American dramatists and playwrights
Living people
Medill School of Journalism alumni
Year of birth missing (living people)